Raszowa  (since 2006 also German Raschowa, before 1936: Raschowa-Rokitsch, 1936-45: Mittenbrück) is a village in the administrative district of Gmina Leśnica, within Strzelce County, Opole Voivodeship, in south-western Poland.

Gallery

References

Raszowa